Labhrás is an Irish given name derived from the Roman surname, Laurentius. Notable people with the name include:

 Labhrás Ó Murchú (born 1939), Director-General of Comhaltas Ceoltóirí Éireann
 Labhrás Mag Fhionnail (baptized 1852–1923), Irish lawyer and statesman

Irish-language masculine given names